Irie Maffia is a Hungarian pop band formed in 2005. Their music is based on reggae and dancehall, which they blend with hip hop, funk and rock. The band also has a sound system  formation (Irie Maffia Soundsystem), where András Kéri (a.k.a. MC Columbo) sings  ragga lyrics on the reggae/dancehall riddims played by band leader Márton Élő (a.k.a. Dermot) and Gáspár Horváth (a.k.a. Jumo Daddy) from vinyl records.

History and present 
Their first recording in 2006 made use of a dancehall riddim, the Rodeo riddim (formerly made popular by the mighty Seeed), which was released by Germaica Records, Europe’s leading reggae/dancehall record company.

The full house release party of the Mafia’s first LP, Fel a kezekkel! (Hands In The Air), took place on A38, a party boat in Budapest, in December, 2007.

To make the most of the success, the Maffia went on tour to several European destinations, amongst which was the Italian Rototom Sunsplash in 2007, probably the greatest reggae competition of the continent. They came in second.

Irie Maffia's first video clip, shot for their most popular song, "Hands In The Air", came out by the spring of 2008.

In autumn 2008 the Irie Maffia is one of the 5 nominees for MTV European Music Awards Local Hero, the voting is now on.

Until February 2013, the band's sound system formation held weekly club nights in Corvintető, offering reggae music to the Tuesday night audience of the venue.

Having fulfilled the requirements of Dutch/foreign trustees, the Maffia took part in Amsterdam's My City Budapest Festival, an event featuring the most important Hungarian bands. They were also asked to participate in a festival in Rovereto, Italy, celebrating the 90th anniversary of the end of World War I, to which each European country's national radio station contributed one band.

In 2015, Vízibility, a one-day event organised by Foundation for Africa, was held to raise awareness to the water problems of the African continent. At the event, Sena Dagadu gave a concert.

Members 
Sena Dagadu - vocals, rap
András Kéri a.k.a. MC Columbo - vocals, rap
Kemon W. Thomas a.k.a. MC Kemon - vocals, rap
István Busa a.k.a. Papa Diamont - rap
Ákos Baranyai a.k.a. DJ Future - turntable
Tamás Dési a.k.a. Monsieur Büdoá - drums
Ádám Meggyes a.k.a. Mézeságyas - trumpet
Márton Élő a.k.a. Dermot - trombone
Gáspár Horváth a.k.a. Jumo Daddy - keyboards
Miklós Havas a.k.a. Doktor úr - bass
Ádám Szekér - guitar
Antal Oláh a.k.a. Monsieur Zsömoá - percussion

Discography 
 Fel a Kezekkel! / Hands In The Air! - 2008
 What's my name? - 2009
 Nagyon jó lesz - 2013
  10 - 2015

Videos 
 Hands In The Air - 2008
 Slow Down Chale - 2009

Appearances 
 Rototom Sunsplash (Udine, Italy) - 2007, 2008
 My City Budapest (Amsterdam, The Netherlands) - 2008
 Sziget Festival Budapest
Sentiero Di Pace (Path Of Peace) Festival (Rovereto, Italy) - 2008
 Red Bull Music Clash: Irie Maffia vs. Magna Cum Laude (Miskolc, Hungary) - 2008

See also
Hungarian pop

References

External links 
 
 Hands In The Air video
 Songs.hu: Fel a Kezekkel! / Hands In The Air! - link album purchase
 Rototom Sunsplash
 Sentiero Di Pace
 Red Bull Music Clash

Hungarian reggae musical groups